Sissi or Sisi may refer to:

People
 Empress Elisabeth of Austria, known as "Sisi" or "Sissi"; spouse of Franz Joseph I of Austria
Works about Sissi
 The King Steps Out (1936), light comedy directed by Josef von Sternberg
 Sissi trilogy (film) with Romy Schneider:
 Sissi (film) (1955)
 Sissi – The Young Empress (Sissi – Die junge Kaiserin) (1956)
 Sissi – Fateful Years of an Empress (Sissi – Schicksalsjahre einer Kaiserin) (1957)
 Sisi (miniseries) (2009), TV film directed by Xaver Schwarzenberg, with Cristiana Capotondi
 Princess Sissi (1997), French-Canadian animated television series
 Sissi, the Anarchist Empress (Sissi Impératice), a ballet by Maurice Béjart

 Abdel Fattah el-Sisi, President of Egypt since 2014
 Sissi (footballer) (born 1967), Brazilian football player Sisleide do Amor Lima
 Sisinio González Martínez (born 1986), Spanish footballer known as Sisi
 Sissi Christidou, Greek television presenter
 Seyhan Soylu, known as "Sissi", Turkish television personality
 Sisi Zlatanova, Bulgarian researcher in geospatial data

Localities
 Sisi, Crete, a place in Crete, Greece

Other uses
 Elisabeth Delmas, nicknamed 'Sissi', a character in the French animated television series Code Lyoko and its incomplete sequel series Code Lyoko: Evolution.
 Sisi (drink), a Dutch fruit-flavoured beverage
 Sissi (Finnish light infantry), a specialized type of Finnish soldier
 Sissi, name given to the exoplanet HAT-P-14b, which orbits the star HAT-P-14 in the constellation of Hercules

See also
 Cissy (disambiguation)
 Sissy (disambiguation)